Percy George Burge James (9 March 1917 – June 1993) was an English amateur footballer and minor counties cricketer.

James was born in the Rhondda. He began his career with Oxford City before the Second World War. He had a brief professional football career, making two appearances and scoring one goal in the Football League for Luton Town in 1949. He later joined Worcester City as a player-manager. He played amateur international football for Wales.

James also played cricket at minor counties level for Oxfordshire as a leg break bowler between 1938–51, making 27 appearances in the Minor Counties Championship. He died in June 1993.

References

1917 births
1993 deaths
People from Rhondda
Welsh footballers
Oxford City F.C. players
Luton Town F.C. players
Worcester City F.C. players
Worcester City F.C. managers
Association football wingers
English Football League players
Wales amateur international footballers
Welsh cricketers
Oxfordshire cricketers
Welsh football managers